Socio-analysis is the activity of exploration, consultancy, and action research which combines and synthesises methodologies and theories derived from psychoanalysis, group relations, social systems thinking, organisational behaviour, and social dreaming.

Socio-analysis offers a conception of individuals, groups, organisations, and global systems that takes into account conscious and unconscious aspects and potentialities. From this conception are born methods of exploration which can increase capacities through making conscious what was unconscious for individuals, groups, and organisations, and through releasing energy and ideas that help create individual and organizational direction, and meaning.

Socio-analysis has at its heart a query as to what is the psychological truth for an individual, group, organisation, or other social system, and how may this best be brought to light as a means for creative transformation and growth?

Socio-analysis and wonder

Anxiety, its exploration, and understanding are of central concern to psychoanalysis, which was founded to explore the mental problems of medical patients. While socio-analytic exploration frequently uncovers systemic pain, (of which anxiety is a part), the "pain" is a guide to transformation of the system as a whole with all its potentialities for growth. Joshua Bain has suggested that the emphasis on anxiety is limiting, and that a more appropriate paradigm for socio-analysis is wonder. Wonder was regarded by Plato as the beginning of philosophy, and its link to exploration, creativity, and the growth of capacities of human beings, would seem to make it the appropriate starting point for socio-analysis  as well.

"Wonder is the special affection of a philosopher; for philosophy has no other starting point than this; and it is a happy genealogy which makes Iris the daughter of Thaumas". Theaetetus, 155D

The saying "When wonder ceases, knowledge begins", which is attributed to Sir Francis Bacon, is especially apt for socio-analysis with its emphasis on always explore, rather than sit tight on what is supposedly known.

Brief history

Socio-analysis has its roots in the first Northfield Experiment carried out by Wilfred Bion and John Rickman, and reported in the Lancet in 1943, and later by Bion in the Bulletin of the Menninger Clinic in 1946. Bion is generally regarded as the father of socio-analysis (although the word was not used in those days).

Wilfred Bion

Wilfred Bion was born in India in 1897 and educated at Bishop's Stortford College in England. During the First World War he commanded a tank on the Western Front and was decorated for bravery: Distinguished Service Order, and the Legion of Honour. After studying history at Oxford University, and a stint teaching history at his old school, he began medical training at University College Hospital in 1924 and qualified in 1930. He worked at the Tavistock Clinic in London before the Second World War, and started a personal psychoanalysis with John Rickman. After the Second World War he contributed to the formation of the Tavistock Institute.  He had a second psycho-analysis with Melanie Klein, and trained and qualified as a psychoanalyst. Bion was, and is, regarded by many people as a genius who made fundamental contributions to psychoanalysis, and to the understanding of groups. His stance of always pointing to the unknown, whether with a patient or with a group or in himself, was the realization of his genius.

Northfield experiments

Northfield Hospital was a military hospital, situated in Birmingham, in the English Midlands, with the task of treating soldiers who had developed psychiatric problems, in order to get them back into the war. Together with John Rickman, Wilfred Bion introduced group meetings as the principal method of change for these patients. This experiment, together with the Second Northfield Experiment associated with the innovations of S. H. Foulkes, Tom Main and Harold Bridger, contributed the following elements to the emerging discipline of socio-analysis:
Attention to, and making hypotheses, and interpretations, about conscious and unconscious functioning at the level of the group. A group was no longer regarded as simply an aggregate of individuals, but as having its own intrinsic dynamics that required understanding and interpretation.
The concept of working therapeutically with the "institution as a whole", or the "whole community". The idea of the "therapeutic community" which burgeoned after the Second World War, e.g. at the Menninger Clinic in Kansas, and the Cassel Hospital in London has its origins in Main's work at Northfield.
The significance of creating "transitional space" for therapy, action projects, and development, so that people, (in this case patients), are enabled to take up their own authority for task. Bridger pioneered this approach at Northfield through his celebrated "Club", a space for patients to make of it what they wished to, without the use of the space being determined by hospital or military staff. Bridger continued to develop this approach to working with groups and organisations of all kinds after the War.

Socio-analytic role

The Northfield Experiments heralded a socio-analytic consultant role: one of exploration of individual, group, and organisational phenomena which are linked dynamically. The socio-analyst, as exemplified by the role Bion took at Northfield, and after the War in his group explorations at the Tavistock Clinic, works from a stance of "not knowing" with the courage, and fortitude, to pursue psychological truth.

The socio-analyst, like the psychoanalyst, uses concepts such as the unconscious, defences, splitting, projection, projective identification, introjection, and transference, but the field for exploration, while including the individual, is wider than the psychoanalytic dyad – e.g. a group, an organisation, a society, global systems.

Thus, for example, the socio-analyst uses concepts of group and organisational transference, and pays particular attention to the way he/she is made to feel through client engagements, as a possible indication of unconscious dynamics within the client system.

Group relations theory and Tavistock conferences

Bion's exploration of group dynamics at the Tavistock Clinic in London after the war culminated in a seminal publication "Experiences in Groups", which describes and analyses three basic assumptions that can be observed in group behaviour at different times: basic assumption dependency, basic assumption fight / flight, and basic assumption pairing. Basic assumptions operate unconsciously within groups at the same time a group may be engaged in a conscious work task – that Bion called a W group.

These insights of Bion together with theories of Kurt Lewin led to the first Group Relations Conference in 1957 that was sponsored by the Tavistock Institute of Human Relations and Leicester University, and directed by Eric Trist.
Group Relations Conferences typically explore the effects of group and organisational dynamics on how individuals take up authority and leadership in this temporary institution, and in their work.

The "Leicester" Conference as it came to be known under the leadership of A.K. Rice and colleagues such as Pierre Turquet, Eric Miller, Robert Gosling, and Bruce Reed stimulated similar explorations and enterprises in numerous countries: United States, Canada, Mexico, Peru, France, Éire, Germany, Sweden, Denmark, Norway, Bulgaria, Finland, Belgium, the Netherlands, Italy, Spain, South Africa, Israel, India, and Australia.

Other influences

Other influences on the nascent discipline of socio-analysis that emerged from the work of social scientists at the Tavistock Institute in the 1950s were action research; the discovery of socio-technical systems  by Eric Trist and Ken Bamforth, its development by Trist and Emery, Rice and Miller; and Elliott Jaques and Isabel Menzies's concept of social systems being structured as a defence against anxiety.

Recent innovations

Social dreaming

A recent methodology for the exploration of social phenomena has been the discovery of social dreaming by Gordon Lawrence at the Tavistock Institute in 1982.
Social dreaming is the activity of sharing dreams (night dreams), associations to the dreams, and connections between dreams, with others in a Matrix setting. The focus of social dreaming (unlike in psychoanalysis or dreaming groups) is not on the meaning of the dream for the individual dreamer, but regarding the dreams and associations as a way of exploring and making social meaning. Conferences to explore social dreaming have been held in Israel, the United States, Australia, India, and most European countries.

Up until 1996 the work that has been described in this article went under different labels. There was no one word that described the activities and the role. Alastair Bain suggested that the discipline should be called "Socio-Analysis" in 1996.

Organisation dynamics

The Australian Institute of Socio-Analysis pioneered a three-year professional training program in socio-analysis in 1999, and began publishing a journal Socioanalysis in 1999. While the Australian Institute of Socio-Analysis no longer exists, the work of socio-analysis continues to be developed by the National Institute of Organisation Dynamics Australia (NIODA). Other organisations which do socio-analytic or closely related work include the William Alanson White Institute in New York, the A.K. Rice Institute (AKRI) in the United States, the Tavistock Institute, Tavistock Clinic, the Grubb Institute and OPUS, all in London, the Centre for Applied Research in Philadelphia, the International Society for the Psychoanalytic Study of Organisations , the University of Wuppertal , and practitioners from many countries who work in the tradition of Wilfred Bion. The journal Socioanalysis is now published by Group Relations Australia.

Organisational dreaming 
Current developments in socio-analysis include Bain's discovery of organisational dreaming,
which is based on the observation that dreams are "container sensitive", and that the dreams shared by people within an organisation during a project will reflect organisational realities that are the "unexpressed known" within the organisation.

Authority, wonder and the sangha

The work of the Centre for Socio-Analysis has also led to a formulation of "authority" that is based in wonder and the sangha (Buddhist notion of "people on the path") in contrast to usual understandings that are based on the individual, anxiety, and hierarchy.

See also
 Socio-technical systems
 Sociotechnical systems theory
 Nazareth-Conferences

References

External links
 Grubb Institute in UK.
 Group Relations Australia
 International Society for the Psychoanalytic Study of Organisations
 IPTAR
 National Institute of Organisation Dynamics Australia (NIODA)
 OPUS, UK.
 Social Dreaming Institute
 Tavistock Clinic
 Tavistock Institute
 University of Wuppertal
 PRO consult the Netherlands
 The A.K. Rice Institute for the Study of Social Systems (AKRI) in USA

Social systems
Social psychology